Matthew O. Williams (born October 3, 1981) is a sergeant major in the United States Army. He received the Medal of Honor from President Donald Trump on October 30, 2019, for his actions on April 6, 2008, as a member of Operational Detachment Alpha 3336, Special Operations Task Force 11, Combined Joint Special Operations Task Force-Afghanistan in the Battle of Shok Valley.

Early life 
Williams was born October 3, 1981, and spent most of his childhood in the small town of Boerne, Texas. He initially wanted to be a detective or work for the FBI when he grew up, so he obtained a bachelor's degree in criminal justice at Angelo State University in San Angelo, Texas. After 9/11, Williams started rethinking how he could serve his country. He researched Special Forces programs and, in September 2005, joined the United States Army.

Military career
In 2007, two years after he had joined the army, Williams became a Special Forces Weapons Sergeant (18B) with the 3rd Special Forces Group. Williams' first deployment was to Afghanistan and, on April 6, 2008, his unit was tasked to capture or kill high-value targets in the Shok Valley. The operation led to the events for which Williams was awarded the Medal of Honor.

Williams, Lieutenant Colonel William D. Swenson, Sergeant Major Thomas Payne and Master Sergeant Earl Plumlee are the only Medal of Honor recipients still on active duty. Williams was promoted to sergeant major during a ceremony at Fort Bragg, North Carolina, on February 28, 2020.

Awards and decorations

Medal of Honor citation

Personal life
Williams lives in North Carolina, with his wife Kate and son Nolan.

References

1981 births
Angelo State University alumni
Living people
Members of the United States Army Special Forces
Recipients of the Meritorious Service Medal (United States)
United States Army Medal of Honor recipients
War in Afghanistan (2001–2021) recipients of the Medal of Honor
United States Army personnel of the War in Afghanistan (2001–2021)
United States Army soldiers